
The Sultanate of Oman has an area of 309,500 square kilometers and is composed of varying topographic areas consisting of plains (3%), mountains (15%) and wadies (valleys (dry rivers beds)) and desert (82%).The above posed a challenge for DGCS, ROP to upkeep the civil registration status. The National Registration System (NRS) is a CRVS (civil registration and vital statistics) system that links 12 civil status directorates throughout the sultanate. It is operated by qualified staff and utilizes sophisticated computer systems. However, these 12 civil directorates were established only in the main towns of Oman (four governorates and five regions).  For people who are living in remote areas, they do not have access to these directorates. They will have to travel a great distance to register or renew their civil status; it is costly for many of these folks.

In many parts of the sultanate, there are pockets of residence spread over vast areas. Some of these areas are remote and difficult to reach via land or urban transportation. One example is the Musandam Peninsula, it is an exclave of Oman, separated from the rest of the country by the United Arab Emirates. The Musandam Peninsula has an area of 1,800 square kilometers (695 sq mi) and a population of 28,727 people. It is located 500 kilometers from Muscat and consists of mountains and coastline. Madha is located halfway between the Musandam Peninsula and the main body of Oman.  It is part of the Musandam governorate, covering approximately 75 km2 (29 sq mi). Access to Musandam by land is possible through coast road from the United Arab Emirates, by using passenger ferry or by air.

Masirah, an island off the East Coast of Oman, 95 km long north-south, between 12 and 14 km wide, with an area of about 649 km², and a population estimated at 12,000 in twelve villages mainly in the north of the island (9,292 as of the census of 2003, of which were 2,311 foreigners). The only way to access the area is using passenger ferry or by air. The next example is Wahiba Sands, or Ramlat al-Wahiba (also called Sharqiya Sands), are a region of desert in Oman. The area is defined by a boundary of 180 kilometers (112 mi) north to south and 80 kilometers (50 mi) east to west, with an area of 12,500 square kilometers (4,800 sq mi).  Within all the examples above, the residence over there are spread into smaller communities, some are less than 20 in a village.

Launch

On 11 April 2009, the mobile registration units (MRUs) were established to tackle the above problem. Using modern technology, MRU were added to complement the network of NRS directorates to provide quick and expeditious service to users living in remote areas. These mobile registration units are compact, highly portable equipment that can be packed into vehicles or even hand-carried. It was specially designed to operate in difficult terrain and weather conditions. Most importantly, it is capable of carrying out a similar function to those performed in any local registration office.

Role

Another important point is that the MRU also play a role in the (Consultative Assembly of Oman) Majlis al-Shura election, where the mobile units are used to install the eVoting application in the Omani ID cards to allow the voters to use their ID cards in the process of election.  This service was launched on January 3, 2011. These units consist of a laptop, a camera, a signature scanner, fingerprint scanner and ID card reader. It supports the registration of new voters and the instant installation of an electoral applet and registering the voting location. This promotes transparency in the electoral process. Before, one voter could cast multiple votes in different electoral boundaries. With the eVoting application, it enforces the one-man-one-vote policies. Also, it allows the flexibility of voters’ casting votes in his selected electoral area without having to be physically present. This is extremely important as many works in the capital but are originally from remote areas.

MRU and NRS

The MRU service is an important component of the National Registration System (NRS). The NRS is primarily for the purpose of establishing the legal documents required by the law (ID cards, resident cards and birth, death certificates) in addition to recording marriages and divorces events. These records are the main source of vital statistics concerning Civil Status. Accuracy and timeliness of civil registration are essential for quality vital statistics and planning. The MRU is vital in ensuring that the objective of the NRS is achieved, especially for remote areas and disable (People with special needs) who can be served at their home because the mobile unit comes to them.

External links
ROP website
Civil Status website

Government of Oman